Arp 7 (PGC 24836) is a spiral galaxy in the constellation Hydra.  Redshift-independent measurements of its distance vary widely, from 5.9 Mpc to 83.7 Mpc.  Its morphological classification is SB(rs)bc, meaning it is a barred spiral galaxy with some ring-like structure.

Arp 7 was imaged by Halton Arp and included in his Atlas of Peculiar Galaxies under the category of 'split arm' galaxies.  Five other galaxies are also included in this section of the atlas: Arp 8 (NGC 497), Arp 9 (NGC 2523), Arp 10 (UGC 1775), Arp 11 (UGC 717), and Arp 12 (NGC 2608).

See also
List of largest galaxies

References

Notes

External links 
 Full Arp Atlas
 Arp Atlas image of Arp 7
 Constellation Locator
 SIMBAD Astronomical Database
 NASA/IPAC Extragalactic Database

Barred spiral galaxies
007
24836
Peculiar galaxies
Hydra (constellation)